Ligand dependent nuclear receptor corepressor like is a protein that in humans is encoded by the LCORL gene.

Function

This gene encodes a transcription factor that appears to function in spermatogenesis. Polymorphisms in this gene are associated with measures of skeletal frame size and adult height. Alternative splicing results in multiple transcript variants.

References

Further reading